The 2022–23 Rider Broncs men's basketball team represented Rider University in the 2022–23 NCAA Division I men's basketball season. The Broncs, led by 11th-year head coach Kevin Baggett, played their home games at the Alumni Gymnasium in Lawrenceville, New Jersey as members of the Metro Atlantic Athletic Conference.

Previous season
The Broncs finished the 2021–22 season 14–19, 8–12 in MAAC play to finish in a tie for seventh place. In the MAAC tournament, they defeated Manhattan in the first round, upset top-seeded Iona in the quarterfinals, before falling to Monmouth in the semifinals.

Roster

Schedule and results

|-
!colspan=12 style=| Exhibition

|-
!colspan=12 style=| Regular season

|-
!colspan=12 style=| MAAC tournament

Sources

References

Rider Broncs men's basketball seasons
Rider Broncs
Rider Broncs men's basketball
Rider Broncs men's basketball